Samuel Kola Okikiolu (born 15 January 1982) is an English former professional footballer who played as a centre back.

Career
Born in London, Okikiolu began his career with Wimbledon, and joined Scottish side Clyde on a two-month loan spell in August 2001, making three appearances for them in the Scottish Football League. Okikioulu left Wimbledon in 2002 without having made a first-team appearance, and joined Aylesbury United, making one appearance for them in September 2002. Okikiolu joined Staines Town in July 2004, and later played for Margate, before signing for in Harrow Borough in August 2006. Okikiolu later spent two spells at Folkestone Invicta, and also played for East Thurrock and Enfield Town.

References

1982 births
Living people
English footballers
Wimbledon F.C. players
Clyde F.C. players
Aylesbury United F.C. players
Staines Town F.C. players
Margate F.C. players
Harrow Borough F.C. players
East Thurrock United F.C. players
Folkestone Invicta F.C. players
Enfield Town F.C. players
Scottish Football League players
Association football central defenders